Serraria (meaning Sawmill in Portuguese) is a neighbourhood (bairro) in the city of Porto Alegre, the state capital of Rio Grande do Sul, in Brazil. It was created by Law 6893 from September 12, 1991.

Serraria is a middle and lower class neighbourhood in Porto Alegre. It is also home to Vila dos Sargentos, a shanty-town located on the bank of Guaíba Lake.

Neighbourhoods in Porto Alegre
Populated places established in 1991
1991 establishments in Brazil